Karel Sadsuitubun Airport  is an airport located in Kai Islands, Southeast Maluku Regency, Maluku, Indonesia,  replacing the old Dumatubin Airport  which is now used only by the Indonesian Air Force. It serves both the city of Tual and the Langgur. The airport is named in honor of Karel Satsuit Tubun (1928–1965), who is a National Hero of Indonesia. The airport serves as the point of entry to Kai Islands, which contains many tourist spot such as untouched beaches which contain crystal clear water. Construction of the airport started in 2006 and after extensive delay, it was completed in 2013. The airport was inaugurated by former Minister of Transportation, Ignasius Jonan on Friday 19 December 2014. The inauguration was held simultaneously, in conjunction with the inauguration of 20 ports and 10 airports across Indonesia. The airport began operation on Monday, 24 February 2014, characterized by first landing aircraft of the airline Trigana Air.

The airport originally has a runway of 1,650 m x 30 m. To accommodate larger aircraft such as the Boeing 737, Fokker 100 and Airbus A320, the runway was extended to 2,100 m in 2015, and again to 2,350 m at the end of 2015. The airport have an apron which have an area of 208 m x 132 m and a single taxiway which have an area of 125 m x 23 m. On the ground side, the airport has one terminal which has an area of 3,694 m2, a departure lounge of 876 m2 and an arrival lounge of 1,079 m2.

Facilities
It has one runway designated 13/31 with an asphalt surface measuring 2,350 m x 45 m (7710 ft × 148 ft).

Airlines and destinations

The following destinations are served from Karel Sadsuitubun Airport:

References

External links 
Karel Sadsuitubun Airport - Indonesia Airport Global Website

Airports in Maluku